Dorothy (Molly) Lazechko (June 3, 1926 – September 1, 2010) was an American politician from Idaho. She represented District 16 in the Idaho House of Representatives as a Democrat.

Early life 
Lazechko was born in Innisfail, Alberta in Canada.

Education 
She achieved a bachelor's degree in Education at Boise State University in 1976.

Career 
In 1991, a scholarship in her name was established.

Death 
Lazechko died in 2010 in Boise, Idaho.

References 

1926 births
2010 deaths
Democratic Party members of the Idaho House of Representatives
Women state legislators in Idaho
20th-century American politicians
20th-century American women politicians
21st-century American politicians
21st-century American women politicians
People from Boise, Idaho
Boise State University alumni